Spree Commerce is an open-source headless e-commerce platform. 

It was created by Sean Schofield in 2007 and has since had over 800 contributors and over 1.5 million downloads from RubyGems.

Companies using Spree include Goop (company), Craftsman, Kenmore, DieHard, New England Patriots, Blue Bottle Coffee, Fortnum and Mason, GoDaddy, Everlane, Surfdome

Popular use cases 

Popular technical use cases:
 Custom-built online store
 Headless commerce
 Multi-store dashboard
 Multi-tenant platform

Popular business use cases:
 Contextual Commerce
 Unified Retail & Online
 International E-Commerce
 Multi-vendor marketplace
 B2B or B2B2C E-Commerce
 Subscription E-Commerce

Popular 3rd party integrations:
 Payment processor
 3PL integration
 ERP integration
 POS integration
 Analytics dashboard
 Tax calculation service

Official Spree extensions 

Extensions are the primary mechanism for customizing a Spree site. They allow Spree developers to share reusable code with one another. Extensions simplify the process of adding features to ecommerce websites. Spree extensions include utilities for product subscription, asset management, marketing, admin reports, roles and permissions, gift cards & promotions, delivery slots, item returns, social media marketing, and one-page checkout.

Spree Commerce multi-vendor marketplace 

Spree also features a multi-vendor marketplace, which allows the operators of e-commerce sites to act as sales platforms for 3rd party vendors. This is managed by means of an extension.

Spree Commerce history 

On July 1, 2011, Spree received $1.5 million in seed funding from AOL and True Ventures. On February 25, 2014 Spree raised an additional $5M in Series A funding led by Thrive Capital. Also participating were Vegas Tech Fund (led by Zappos CEO Tony Hsieh), Red Swan (led by Bonobos CEO Andy Dunn) as well as existing investors True Ventures and AOL Ventures.

On September 21, 2015 it was acquired by First Data. After the First Data acquisition, developers from Spark Solutions and VinSol now maintain and develop the Spree Commerce Open Source project. Vinsol also develops Spree extensions.

In 2016 an OpenCommerce Conference was held in New York to showcase the newest e-commerce projects running on Spree.

In 2021 Spree changed its model from a full-stack e-commerce platform to a headless application allowing non-Ruby developers to customize and run Spree applications. JavaScript SDK also became available.

In 2022 Upside Lab became the main maintainer of Spree Commerce.

See also

 Comparison of free and open source eCommerce web application framework

References

External links
 
Free e-commerce software
Ruby (programming language)
Software using the BSD license